Kaipuleohone is a digital ethnographic archive that houses audio and visual files, photographs, as well as hundreds of textual material such as notes, dictionaries, and transcriptions relating to small and endangered languages. The archive is stored in the ScholarSpace repository of the University of Hawai‘i at Mānoa and maintained by the Department of Linguistics of the University's College of Languages, Linguistics and Literature. Kaipuleohone was established by Nick Thieberger in 2008. It is a member of the Digital Endangered Languages and Musics Archiving Network (DELAMAN). The term kaipuleohone means 'gourd of sweet words' and symbolizes the impression of an accumulation of language material.

Kaipuleohone comprises several collections including Kaipuleohone Audio Files, the Bickerton Collection, the Blust Collection, the Bradshaw Collection, and the Sato Collection. The archive director is Andrea L. Berez-Kroeker.

See also
Language Documentation & Conservation
ScholarSpace

References

External links
Kaipuleohone web portal
ScholarSpace
Language Documentation & Conservation journal
UHM Department of Linguistics
DELAMAN

Ethnography
University of Hawaiʻi
Archives in the United States
Sound archives in the United States
Endangered languages projects